Masfjordnes is the administrative centre of Masfjorden municipality in Vestland county, Norway. The village lies along the southern shore of the Masfjorden, along Norwegian County Road 570.

The small village is often called Sandnes by the locals since Sandnes Church is located here. There was a factory that dyed cloth and yarn on the west side of Masfjordnes from 1889 until 1954.

References

Villages in Vestland
Masfjorden